Neil John Turner (25 June 1934 – 4 July 2011) was a National Party politician from Queensland. He served as the Minister of Transport and  Speaker of the Legislative Assembly of Queensland.

Turner was born in 1934 in Charleville. He served as the member for Warrego between 1974 and 1986, and the member for Nicklin between 1990 and 1998, when he lost his seat to independent Peter Wellington. He served as Speaker from 1996 until his 1998 defeat.

On 4 July 2011, Turner died at the age of 77.

References

1934 births
2011 deaths
Members of the Queensland Legislative Assembly
National Party of Australia members of the Parliament of Queensland
Speakers of the Queensland Legislative Assembly